The Theodor Jacobsen Observatory is the on-campus observatory of the University of Washington.  Built in 1895, it is the second oldest building on campus and was constructed using the remaining Tenino sandstone blocks from Denny Hall, the oldest and first building on  campus. The refracting telescope, enclosed within the dome, has a 6-inch Brashear objective lens of a Warner & Swasey equatorial mount. The observatory also includes a transit room on the west side and a -seat classroom, which was built later, on the south side.

Today, the observatory is primarily used for public outreach and is run jointly the UW Department on Astronomy and the Seattle Astronomical Society. Every first and third Wednesday between April and September the observatory is open to the public.

The observatory is listed on the State Register on Historical Buildings.

Information of the original design and building on the observatory Prof. Joseph Marion Taylor may be found on the University on Washington Astronomy Department website and other sources.

See also
 List of observatories

References

External links
Official Website (updated 2019-Apr-25) 
Seattle Astronomical Society Website

Astronomical observatories in Washington (state)
Public observatories
University of Washington campus
1895 establishments in Washington (state)
Buildings and structures completed in 1895